Let's Talk Sex with Dr. Pega Ren (often referred to as simply Let's Talk Sex) is a Canadian English language talk show, produced by Convergent Entertainment, which premiered on September 1, 2008 at 11 pm EST on Canadian digital cable specialty channel, OUTtv.

Premise
Let's Talk Sex is a sex and relationship advice talk show for the LGBT community. Dr. Pega Ren, a sex therapist, answers questions from viewers and gives advice on sex and relationships. Co-host Jonny Staub introduces the questions and provides commentary and follow-up questions for Dr. Pega Ren.

References

External links
 Show page on OUTtv

OutTV (Canadian TV channel) original programming
2008 Canadian television series debuts
2000s Canadian television talk shows
2000s Canadian LGBT-related television series